The 2013 Netball Superleague Grand Final featured Team Bath and Celtic Dragons. Team Bath secured their fifth Netball Superleague title in eight years with a victory over Dragons. Dragons, who were playing their first grand final won the second quarter by two points to lead 31–30 at half-time.
However Team Bath fought back and entered the final quarter with a two-point advantage at 46–44.
Although Dragons kept themselves in the game with three successive goals, Team Bath stretched clear in the final two minutes to win it.

Route to the Final

Match summary

Teams

References

2013 Netball Superleague season
2013
Team Bath (netball) matches
Celtic Dragons
Netball Superleague
Netball Superleague